Erki may refer to:
 Estonian Academy of Arts (Eesti Riiklik Kunstiinstituut)
 Erki (given name), Estonian male given name
 an alternative spelling of Irkay, Lebanon